Jorge Celedón also known as Jorgito Celedón is a Colombian musician and singer of vallenato music. Celedón was one of the backup singers for the vallenato group Binomio de Oro de America who joined after the death of Rafael Orozco Maestre. In 1998, he decided to create his own vallenato group and teamed with accordionist Jimmy Zambrano.

Early life
Celedon grew up singing vallenato making him a very good singer. His first performance was with his uncle Daniel Celedón, in his own group called Doble Poder (Double Power). This helped him to become a great star of vallenato by the time he was an adult.

Latin Grammy
Celedon and his vallenato group were nominated for the Latin Grammy Awards on 29 August  2007 in Miami. At the 8th Annual Latin Grammy Awards ceremony held on 8 November 2007 in Las Vegas, United States, Celedón and accordionist Jimmy Zambrano received the award in the category Cumbia/Vallenato for their album Son... Para El Mundo (Sony BMG Music/North) .
In July 2008, he performed in front of president George W. Bush at an event at the White House in celebration of Colombian independence day.

Discography
Binomio de Oro de América

1993 - Todo Corazón
1994 - De la Mano con el Pueblo
1995 - Lo Nuestro

Jean Carlos Centeno and Jorgito Celedon became lead singers

1996 - A su Gusto
1997 - Seguimos por lo Alto
1998 - 2000
1999 - Más cerca de tí

With Jimmy Zambrano
2001 - Romántico Como Yo
2002 - Llevame en Tus Sueños 	
2003 - Canto Vallenato
2004 - Nuevas Canciones del Alma
2004 - ¡Juepa je!
2006 - Son Para el Mundo
2009 - La invitacion
2011 - "Lo que tú necesitas"
2013 - "Celedón Sin Fronteras Vol 1"(Shared album with Gustavo García) 
2014 -  "Celedón Sin Fronteras Vol 2"(Shared album with Gustavo García)

With Gustavo García
2014 -  "Sencillamente"

With Sergio Luis Rodríguez
2017 -  "Ni un paso atrás"
2020 -  "Sigo cantando al amor"

Awards and nominations

Latin Grammy Awards
A Latin Grammy Award is an accolade by the Latin Academy of Recording Arts & Sciences to recognize outstanding achievement in the music industry. Jorge Celedón has received the award four times from six nominations.

|-
| 2006 || Grandes Exitos En Vivo || Best Cumbia/Vallenato Album || 
|-
| 2007 || Son...Para El Mundo || Best Cumbia/Vallenato Album || 
|-
| 2008 || "Me Vio Llorar" || Best Tropical Song || 
|-
| 2012 || Lo Que Tú Necesitas || Best Cumbia/Vallenato Album || 
|-
| 2014 || Celedón Sin Fronteras, Vol. 1 || Best Cumbia/Vallenato Album || 
|-
| 2015 || Sencillamente || Best Cumbia/Vallenato Album || 
|-
| 2017 || Ni Un Paso Atrás || Best Cumbia/Vallenato Album || 
|-
| 2020 || Sigo Cantando al Amor (Deluxe) || Best Cumbia/Vallenato Album || 
|-

Premios Nuestra Tierra
A Premio Nuestra Tierra is an accolade that recognizes outstanding achievement in the Colombian music industry. Jorge Celedón has received four nominations.

|-
| style="text-align:center;" rowspan="4"|2014 || Celedón Sin Fronteras, Vol.1 || Album of the Year  || 
|-
| Himself|| Best Vallenato Artist or Group || 
|-
| "La Candela Viva" (with Totó la Momposina) || Best Folk Performance of the Year  || 
|-
|  Himself || Tweeter of the Year ||

See also
Binomio de Oro de America

References

External links
 Jorge Celedon official website
Jimmy Zambrano - official

1968 births
Living people
Colombian musicians
Latin Grammy Award winners
Vallenato musicians
Sony Music Latin artists
Sony Music Colombia artists
Colombian songwriters
Male songwriters
Latin music songwriters